The Secret of Cassandra is a Big Finish Productions audio drama featuring Lisa Bowerman as Bernice Summerfield, a character from the spin-off media based on the long-running British science fiction television series Doctor Who.

Plot 
On the Earth colony Chosan, Bernice finds herself caught up in war between two nations. Close to death, she is rescued by the captain of the Cassandra only to find herself in even more danger.

Cast
Bernice Summerfield - Lisa Bowerman
Captain Damien Colley - Lennox Greaves
General Hannah Brennan - Sally Faulkner
Sheen - Robert Curbishley
Computer Voice - Helen Goldwyn

Trivia
Bernice returns to Chosan in The Poison Seas.

External links
Big Finish Productions - Professor Bernice Summerfield: The Secret of Cassandra

Bernice Summerfield audio plays
Fiction set in the 27th century